Totara River may refer to

 Totara River (Buller District)
 Totara River (Westland District)